A New Dictionary of the Terms Ancient and Modern of the Canting Crew is a dictionary of English cant and slang by a compiler known only by the initials B. E., first published in London c. 1698. With over 4,000 entries, it was the most extensive dictionary of non-standard English in its time, until it was superseded in 1785 by Francis Grose's Classical Dictionary of the Vulgar Tongue. B. E.'s New Dictionary was used as a source by many subsequent dictionaries.

Its full title is A new dictionary of the terms ancient and modern of the canting crew, in its several tribes, of gypsies, beggers, thieves, cheats, &c. with an addition of some proverbs, phrases, figurative speeches, &c.

See also 
 Cant (language)

Notes

References

External links
Digital version of the 1899 edition @ Internet Archive

English dictionaries
1698 books